William Frank Strawbridge (24 January 1896 – 25 January 1971) was an Australian rules footballer who played with Fitzroy in the Victorian Football League (VFL).

In 1920 Strawbridge moved to Prahran in the Victorian Football Association and he later played in Minyip and Echuca.

He was appointed coach of Longford in 1929, but resigned part way through the season due to business commitments.

Notes

External links 

		
Frank Strawbridge's playing statistics from The VFA Project

1896 births
1971 deaths
Australian rules footballers from Victoria (Australia)
Fitzroy Football Club players
Prahran Football Club players